Jacques Trémolet de Villers (born 6 September 1944, Mende, Lozère) is a French writer and lawyer.

Biography
Trémolet de Villers was a collaborator of the politician Jean-Louis Tixier-Vignancour. In 1974 he founded his law practice, where he handled some famous legal matters such as the inheritance issues of Émilien Amaury, the founder of the media group Amaury-Le Parisien. He also handled the affair of Philippe de Dieuleveult's disappearance, the defense of Jean-Charles Marchiani, former prefect of Var, as well as that of the mayor Pierre Bernard and that of the war criminal Paul Touvier.

He is also a member of the Cercle de l'Oeillet blanc, headed for a long time by Guy Coutant de Saisseval, and of the association Gens de France. Trémolet de Villers also supports Jean of Orléans, the monarchist candidate to the French throne.

Publications
 Défendre l'homme : Le message social de Jean-Paul II à la France, CLC, 1980
 Paul Touvier est innocent, Dominique Martin Morin, 1990 
 Immigration et nationalité : quelles réponses ? (dir.), Dominique Martin Morin, 1991 
 L'affaire Touvier: Chronique d'un procès en idéologie, Dominique Martin Morin, 1994 
 Aux Marches du Palais : Pierre-Antoine Berryer, avocat, Dominique Martin Morin, 1997 
 Heureux qui comme Ulysse et vingt-quatre autres poèmes que nous devrions savoir par cœur pour les dire à nos enfants, Dominique Martin Morin, 1998  |978-2856522400
 Lettres d'ailleurs au Prince qui vient, Dominique Martin Morin, 1999 
 Les Fleurs d'Ulysse, Dominique Martin Morin, 2000 
 Paroles de Rois, Dominique Martin Morin, 2001 
 Le rêve de Jules Lebridour : Neuf contes de notre temps, Dominique Martin Morin, 2007 
 Regards : 2006-2007, Editions de Paris, 2008

References

Far-right politicians in France
People from Mende, Lozère
1944 births
Living people
20th-century French non-fiction writers
20th-century French lawyers
French monarchists